Kevin McGeehan (born October 30, 1973) is an American college basketball coach and the current head men's basketball coach at Campbell University. Prior to taking the helm of the Fighting Camels basketball program, he was the associate head coach at Richmond and served as an assistant for a total of eight seasons. McGeehan was hired at Campbell in April 2013, replacing Robbie Laing. He was named Big South Coach of the Year in 2019.

NCAA Division I coaching record

References

External links
Kevin McGeehan – Campbell

1973 births
Living people
Air Force Falcons men's basketball coaches
American men's basketball coaches
Campbell Fighting Camels basketball coaches
College men's basketball head coaches in the United States
Gettysburg Bullets men's basketball players
High school basketball coaches in the United States
Richmond Spiders men's basketball coaches
American men's basketball players